Armenian Footballer of the Year is an annual award given to the best professional Armenian football player. The winner is elected by Football Federation of Armenia members, referees, inspectors, coaches, captains and presidents of the Armenian Premier League clubs, as well as the journalists and media. On the same occasion, an award is also given for Armenian Coach of the Year.

History
The same year the Football Federation of Armenia was founded, an award for the best Armenian football player began being annually given. The first award was given to former Armenia national football team captain Sargis Hovsepyan in 1992. Hovsepyan, who became the first player to win the award three times, is currently second to Henrikh Mkhitaryan who has won the award nine times (including seven times in a row from 2011 to 2017). Arthur Petrosyan and Armen Shahgeldyan have both won the award twice. Edgar Manucharyan became the youngest player to win the award in 2004 at the age of 16. Hovsepyan became the oldest player to win the award in 2008 at the age of 36.

List of recipients

Number of awards per player

References
 

Awards established in 1992
1992 establishments in Armenia
Armenian awards
Annual events in Armenia
Football in Armenia